Auguste Rencurel (4 September 1896 – 19 January 1983) was a French politician.

Rencurel was born in Oued Fodda, Algeria. He represented the Radical Party in the Constituent Assembly elected in 1945, in the Constituent Assembly elected in 1946 and in the National Assembly from 1946 to 1951.

References

1896 births
1983 deaths
People from Chlef Province
People of French Algeria
Pieds-Noirs
Radical Party (France) politicians
Members of the Constituent Assembly of France (1945)
Members of the Constituent Assembly of France (1946)
Deputies of the 1st National Assembly of the French Fourth Republic
French military personnel of World War I